The 2008 Sacramento mayoral election was held on June 3, 2008 and November 4, 2008 to elect the mayor of Sacramento, California. It saw the election of Kevin Johnson, who defeated incumbent mayor Heather Fargo.

Results

First round

Runoff results

References 

Sacramento mayor
2008
Sacramento